Andrew Boyd, Bishop of Argyll (1567–1636) was a Scottish Protestant bishop and Latin poet.

Life

He was born in 1567 the natural son of Robert Boyd, 5th Lord Boyd and half-brother of Thomas Boyd, 6th Lord Boyd. He was educated at Glasgow University graduating MA in 1584.

Boyd was made the parson of Eaglesham in 1589, and was promoted to the see of Argyll, as their Bishop, in March 1613. He was recorded as "a good man, and did much good in his diocese, where he always resided."

He died on 22 December 1636 and is buried in Dunoon parish church. His position as bishop was filled by Rev James Fairlie.

Family
He married Elizabeth (Bessie) Cunningham (Conyngham), daughter of Adam Cunningham of Auchenharvie, and widow of Thomas Boyd of Pilton. [Fasti vol VIII, p. 332]. They had six sons and one daughter:

Thomas Boyd, minister of Eaglesham
Andrew Boyd, Archdeacon of Argyll and minister of Lochgoilhead
George Boyd
James Boyd of Ruchrie
Adam Boyd (d.1649)
Hugh Boyd
Elizabeth, married Rev Andrew Hamilton of Kilbarchan

References
Specific

General
 
 
Jamie Reid Baxter: Mr. Andrew Boyd (1567-1636): A neo-Stoic bishop of Argyll and his writings, in Sixteenth Century Scotland: Essays in honour of Michael Lynch, ed. J. Goodare & A. Macdonald, Brill 2008

1567 births
1636 deaths
17th-century bishops in Scotland
Members of the Convention of the Estates of Scotland 1617
Members of the Parliament of Scotland 1628–1633
Members of the Convention of the Estates of Scotland 1630
Scottish bishops 1560–1638
Scottish poets